The Group 5A North Region is a division of the Virginia High School League. The region was formed in 2013 when the VHSL adopted a six classification format and eliminated the previous three classification system. For the purpose of regular season competition, schools compete within districts that existed prior to 2013, while post-season competition will be organized within four conferences that make up each region. It is a successor to the AAA Northern Region.

Conferences for 2013–14 and 2014–15

Capitol Conference 13
 Thomas Jefferson High School
 George C. Marshall High School
 Thomas A. Edison High School
 Falls Church High School
 Mount Vernon High School (Will move to 6A, Conference 7 in 2015-2016)
 J.E.B. Stuart High School
 Wakefield High School
 Lee High School

Conference 14
 Freedom-South Riding High School (Will move to 4A, Conference 22 in 2015-2016)
 Stone Bridge High School
 Briar Woods High School
 Broad Run High School
 Potomac Falls High School
 Tuscarora High School

Conference 15
 Freedom-Woodbridge High School (Will move to 6A, Conference 4 in 2015-2016)
 Potomac High School
 North Stafford High School
 Brooke Point High School
 Massaponax High School
 Mountain View High School

Conference 16
Albemarle High School
Patrick Henry-Ashland High School
Orange County High School
Halifax High School

External links
 VHSL-Reference 
 Virginia High School League

Virginia High School League
High school sports in Virginia